Fletcher is an outer western suburb of Newcastle, New South Wales, Australia, located  from Newcastle's central business district on the western edge of the City of Newcastle local government area.

Fletcher had a population of over 5,000 in 2016.

The suburb also has a small shopping centre which features a Coles Supermarket, a bakery, butchers, cafe, Subway restaurant, Dominos, hair salon, and a liquor store. There is also an Aldi store in the area. Fletcher also has Oak Close Reserve which is a recreational and sports area.

References

Suburbs of Newcastle, New South Wales